Meggen Lawn Cross is a supposedly supernatural mark of a cross in the ground in Meggen, a village near Argenbühl in Baden-Württemberg, Germany. The Cross first appeared on June 30, 1972 in form of a bald spot in the surrounding field. Later a cross with a length of 3.3 metres and a width of 1.6 metres appeared. 
The cross reappears each year. Its origin is unknown. Investigations by the University of Hohenheim have been unable to find any cause for the phenomenon.

See also 
 Eisenberg an der Raab

References

Geoglyphs
Ravensburg (district)